Fair dealing is a concept of copyright law.

Fair dealing or Fairdealing may also refer to:

The implied covenant of good faith and fair dealing, a concept in contract law
Fairdealing, Kentucky, an unincorporated community in Marshall County
Fairdealing, Missouri, an unincorporated community and census-designated place located in Ripley County and Butler County

See also
Fair Deal